Boffi is an Italian surname. Notable people with the surname include:

Aldo Boffi (1915–1987), Italian footballer
Franco Boffi (born 1958), Italian middle-distance runner
José Luis Boffi (1897–1981), Argentine footballer and manager
Luigi Boffi (1846–1904), Italian architect

Italian-language surnames